Badrul Haider Chowdhury (1 January 1925 – 14 February 1998) was the Chief Justice of Bangladesh from 1 December 1989 to 31 December 1989.

Early life  and education 
Chowdhury was born in Noakhali District of Bengal Presidency, in present-day Bangladesh in 1925 to Khan Bahadur Mohammed Gazi Chowdhury. In 1948, Chowdhury finished his graduate studies in the University of Kolkata and completed his law degree in 1951. In 1955, he was awarded bar-at-law degree from Lincoln's Inn of United Kingdom.

Career
From 1965 to 1971, Chowdhury practiced at the Dhaka High court. In 1pril 1971 he was made of Judge of Dhaka High Court.

After the independence of Bangladesh, Chowdhury was made a judge of Bangladesh High court in January 1972. He was made a judge in the Appellate Division in 1978. His verdict on the 8th Amendment case was a landmark moment of Bangladesh's legal history.1 from December 1989 to 31 December 1989 he was the chief justice of Bangladesh.

Personal life
Chowdhury married Anwara Begum. His daughter Naima Haider became justice of Dhaka High Court.

On 14 February 1998, Chowdhury died in Dhaka, Bangladesh.

References

External links
 List of Chief Justices of Bangladesh.

1925 births
1998 deaths
Supreme Court of Bangladesh justices
Chief justices of Bangladesh
Rajshahi College alumni